Oregon has at least 19 lakes named Lost Lake:

See also 
 List of lakes in Oregon

Lakes of Oregon